Thermoclostridium  caenicola  is a Gram-positive anaerobic bacterium from the genus Thermoclostridium  which has been isolated from methanogenic sludge.

References

 

Bacteria described in 2009
Oscillospiraceae